PMPA may refer to:
Private Motorists Protection Agency, taken over by Axa insurance
Precision Machined Products Association
 Tenofovir disoproxil, a medication known as PMPA